The National Institute of Neurology and Neurosurgery (Instituto Nacional de Neurología y Neurocirugía, or INNN), is a public hospital in Mexico City.

The hospital has 126 beds, for patients of neurosurgery, neurology, and psychiatry.

History 
The INNN was founded in 1964. One of its founders, Manuel Velasco Suárez, became its first director, and the hospital was later renamed for him.

References

External links 
  

Hospitals in Mexico